Thanapat Bunleang (born Khazitin G. Bonleunge, formerly Thanapat Thaothawong), better known by his stage name Thaiboy Digital, is a Thai rapper, singer, producer and fashion designer. Born in Khon Kaen, Thailand, Bunleang moved to Stockholm, Sweden at the age of eight, and is now based in Bangkok. In addition to his solo work, Bunleang is a member of the group Drain Gang.

Biography
Born in the Isan region of Thailand, Bunleang's family moved to Sweden from Thailand in 2003 after his mother became a chef in the Austrian embassy in Stockholm.

In his teen years, Bunleang became involved in the city's music scene, joining what would later become Drain Gang and collaborating with local artists including Yung Lean.

In 2015, due to the end of his mother's work visa, Bunleang was forced to leave Sweden by Migrationsverket, the Swedish immigration authority, and return to Thailand, settling in Bangkok. In Bangkok, Bunleang began recording with local artists such as Younggu and Dandee, while remaining a member of Drain Gang and contributing to all of their subsequent releases, including the 2019 release Trash Island which was partially recorded in Bunleang's apartment in Bangkok.

My Fantasy World is inspired by Basshunter and Tiësto.

Personal life
Bunleang grew up with his grandma and step-grandpa (on his mothers side) in Khon Kaen, his mother, Aphantri, being half black caused Bunleang to be bullied at school back in Thailand. When he was 5, Aphantri got a job within the Swiss embassy at Bangkok as a chef and brought Bunleang with her. When Bunleang was in Bangkok he attended kindergarten with 6-year-olds when he was only 5. One day after school a man came to him claiming to be his father and took him home to his mother, Bunleang was later told the reason why his father appeared that very day but did not go within detail. Bunleang got married on January 7, 2020 and his first child, a daughter, was born on February 9, 2020.

Discography

Albums
 Legendary Member (2019)
My Fantasy World (2020)*
Back 2 Life (2022)

Mixtapes
 Tiger (2014)
 Lord Of Jewels (Return of the Goon)  (2015)
 Yin & Yang (2020)

Collaborative mixtapes
 GTBSG Compilation (2013) (with Bladee, Ecco2k)
 AvP (2016) (with Bladee)
 D&G (2017) (with Bladee, Ecco2K)
Trash Island (2019) (with Bladee, Ecco2k)

Extended plays
 S.O.S: Suicide or Sacrifice (2017)
 The Promised Future Remixes, Vol. 1 (2023)*

Singles
 "Fuck U" (2011)
 "Bank Account" (2013) 
 "B With U" (2013)
 "Moon Girl" (2013)
 "Tiger" (2014)
 "G6" (2014)
 "2 The Starz (with Bladee)" (2014)
 "Haters Broke" (2014)
 "2seats" (2015)
 "Forever Turnt" (2015) (with Younggu, Dandee)
 "Lie 2 Me (with Bladee)" (2016) 
 "Let Go" (2016)
 "Still in Search of Sunshine (with Bladee)" (2016)
 "Climbing" (2017)
 "Magic" (2017)
 "King Cobra" (2018)
 "Lip Service" (2019) (with Ecco2K)
 "Nervous" (2019)
 "IDGAF" (2019)
 "New City" (2020)
 "Yin & Yang" (2020)
 "Triple S" (2020)
 "I Go I Go" (2020)
 "I'm Fresh" (2022)
 "SOM JAG" (2022) (with Bladee)
 "True Love" (2022) (with Yung Lean)

Guest appearances
 Bladee – "Ebay" (2013) (featuring Ecco2K)
 Bladee – "Deletee" (2014)
 Bladee – "Everlasting Flames" (2014)
 Bladee – "Butterfly" (2015 and 2016)
 Yung Lean – "How U Like Me Now?" (2016)
 Yung Lean – "King Cobra" (2018)
 Bladee – "Side by Side" (2018)
 Younggu – "Never Been" (2018) (featuring Twopee Southside, Rahboy)
 Woesum – "Violet Gold" (2021) (featuring Bladee, Yung Lean)
 Woesum – "Only Light" (2021)
 Woesum – Ying & Yang Remix - Remix (2021)
 Bladee – "Inspiration Comes" (2021)
 Yung Lean – "Starz2theRainbow" (2022)

*Under the name Dj Billybool

References

Thai rappers
Swedish rappers
21st-century Thai male singers
21st-century Swedish singers
People from Khon Kaen province
Singers from Stockholm